The Force is the second studio album by English thrash metal band Onslaught, released in May 1986. More successful than their previous album, Power from Hell, The Force is considered a thrash metal classic by fans and critics, and the band's first to feature Sy Keeler on vocals (he would depart in 1988, only to return for the 2007 album Killing Peace). 

The album was re-issued in 2002 by Blackend Records and received a full remaster by Jacob Hansen for the 2013 release on AFM Records, with revamped artwork with liner notes by Nige Rockett. Onslaught have been playing The Force in its entirety recently celebrating its anniversary on The Full Force Tour.

Track listing
All songs written by Onslaught.

Personnel
 Sy Keeler – vocals
 Nige Rockett – guitar
 Jase Stallard – guitar
 Paul Mahoney – bass
 Steve Grice – drums

Production 
 Dave Pine – producer, engineer
 Roy Rowland – mixing

References

1986 albums
Onslaught (band) albums